Chrissy is a given name or nickname for males and females, short for Christina, Chris, Christian, Christine, Christmas, or Charisma, that may refer to:

People with given name

Female
 Chrissy Amphlett (1959–2013), Australian musician
 Chrissy Carpenter (born 1970), American actress
 Chrissy Costanza (born 1995), American musician of Against The Current 
 Chrissy Chau (born 1985), Chinese actress and model
 Chrissy Conway (born 1979), member of ZOEgirl Christian rock band
 Chrissy Gephardt, daughter of American politician Dick Gephardt
 Chrissy Hughes (born 1990), American figure skater
 Chrissy Lampkin (born 1971), on the reality TV show Love & Hip Hop
 Chrissy Pollithy, media consultant and member of the World Scout Committee
 Chrissy Redden (born 1966), Canadian cyclist
 Chrissy Sharp (1947–2021), Australian politician
 Chrissy Schmidt (born 1987), Canadian actress
 Chrissy Sommer (born 1965), American politician
 Chrissy Teigen (born 1985), American model
 Chrissy Wallace (born 1988), American NASCAR driver

Male
 Chrissy McKaigue (born 1989), Irish Gaelic footballer

Fictional characters
 Chrissy, on the soap opera Hollyoaks
 Chrissy Collins, on the sitcom That's So Raven
 Chrissy Costello, on the soap opera Family Affairs
 Chrissy Cunningham, in the science-fiction horror drama Stranger Things
 Chrissy DeWitt, in the 1995 film Now and Then
 Christopher Moltisanti, on The Sopranos, nicknamed Chrissy 
 Chrissy Rogers, on the soap opera Brookside
 Chrissy Seaver, on the sitcom Growing Pains
 Chrissy Snow, on the sitcom Three's Company
 Chrissy, a rabbit villager from the video game series Animal Crossing
 Chrissy Cunningham, a minor character in Stranger Things

See also
 Chrissie
 Chrissy Boy, British musician

Hypocorisms
English-language masculine given names
English-language feminine given names